Artur Oleksandrovych Karnoza (born 2 August 1990) is a Ukrainian retired professional football midfielder.

Karnoza was also the captain of the Ukrainian National Under-19 Football Team.

Honours 
2009 UEFA European Under-19 Football Championship: Champion

External links
 
 
Profile on Official Dnipro Website

1990 births
Living people
Footballers from Dnipro
Ukrainian footballers
Association football midfielders
Ukraine under-21 international footballers
Ukraine youth international footballers
FC Dnipro players
FC Naftovyk-Ukrnafta Okhtyrka players
FC Sevastopol players
FC Karpaty Lviv players
FC Chornomorets Odesa players
SC Dnipro-1 players
FC Mynai players
FC Kryvbas Kryvyi Rih players
FC Alians Lypova Dolyna players
Ukrainian Premier League players
Ukrainian First League players
Ukrainian Second League players